The End of Old Times is a 1989 Czechoslovak comedy film directed by Jiří Menzel.

Cast 
 Josef Abrhám - Duke Alexej
 Marián Labuda - Stoklasa
 Jaromír Hanzlík - Spera
 Rudolf Hrušínský - Jakub Lhota
 Jan Hartl - Pustina
 Jan Hrušínský - Jan Lhota
 Jiří Adamíra - Kotera
 Josef Somr - Charousek

References

External links 

1989 comedy films
1989 films
Czech comedy films
Films directed by Jiří Menzel
1980s Czech-language films
1980s Czech films